Bracigliano is a town and comune in the province of Salerno in the Campania region of south-western Italy.
 
The municipality borders with Forino, Mercato San Severino, Montoro, Quindici and Siano.

Notable People 
Adolfo Bruno - Former Caporegime in the Genovese Crime Family

References

External links

Cities and towns in Campania